This is a list of jangle pop bands. Jangle pop is a genre of rock music created in the 1960s that saw a resurgence in the 1980s.

Artists

 Alvvays
 Barenaked Ladies
 Big Dipper
 The Connells
 The dB's
 Game Theory
 Gin Blossoms
 The Go-Betweens
 Guster
 Her's
 Let's Active
 The Lowest of the Low
 McCarthy
 Pylon
 Rolling Blackouts Coastal Fever
 The Refreshments

References